David Sunflower Seeds, also known as DAVID Seeds, is a brand of roasted and salted sunflower seeds produced by ConAgra Foods in the United States.

History
The company was founded in 1926 by Armenian-American David Der Hairabedian of Fresno, California. Der Hairabedian first roasted sunflower seeds in his grocery store and packaged them in individual servings for a nickel. Eventually, his two sons, Ara and Aram, joined him in marketing the seeds to other retailers.

Conagra Brands acquired David & Sons from Nestle USA in December 2001.

Products
Sunflower Seeds with Shells
Pumpkin Seeds
Sunflower Seeds without Shells
Trail Mix

Flavors

Original – JUMBO seeds
Bar-B-Q – JUMBO seeds
Ranch – JUMBO seeds
Nacho Cheese 
Jalepeño Hot Salsa – JUMBO seeds
Original with Reduced Sodium -JUMBO seeds
Dill Pickle – JUMBO seeds
Hot and Spicy – JUMBO seeds
Buffalo Style Ranch – JUMBO seeds
Cracked Pepper – JUMBO seeds
Sweet & Salty – JUMBO seeds
Sweet & Spicy - JUMBO seeds
Lightly Salted – Simply Seeds
Black Pepper – Simply Seeds
Sour Cream & Onion – Simply Seeds
Sour Cream & Onion – Jumbo Seeds
Sizzling Bacon

Discontinued

Honey Roasted 
Chili Lime - JUMBO seeds
Salsa

Babe Ruth League and DAVID Seeds

Since 1991, DAVID Seeds has sponsored the Babe Ruth League, pitching the “Eat. Spit. Be Happy!”(slogan) message to youth baseball and softball players ages 5 to 18 nationwide. The Babe Ruth League has over 900,000 players in 45,000+ teams across the U.S..

As the “Official Sunflower Seed of the Babe Ruth League,” DAVID provides free scorebooks and safety tips to each team in the league, awards to All-Star players, and DAVID Sunflower Seeds to be sold at concession stands.

Slogans
Eat. Spit. Be Happy!
Lets Get Cracken!

References
  Grain Net ConAgra Acquisition

External links
Official website
 ConAgra Foods website

1926 establishments in California
Armenian-American history
Armenian-American culture in California
Food and drink companies established in 1926
Conagra Brands brands
Companies based in Fresno County, California
Snack foods